Before Shane Went to Bangkok: Live in the USA is the only live music EP by the band fun. It was recorded in 2013 during Fun's North American tour. The name of the EP refers to Fun's guitar tech and photographer Shane Timm. The EP was released December 17, 2013 as a digital download and also as a vinyl bundle including photographs taken during the tour, limited to 1,000 pressings, and was released primarily as a way of thanking the fans for attending the shows. Most notably, the EP contains a previously unreleased track called What the Fuck that was performed only in Fun's live sets.

Track listing

  "Out on the Town" (4:35)
  "Barlights" (8:03)
  "Carry On" (4:51)
  "What the Fuck" (6:42)
  "The Gambler" (5:06)
  "Some Nights" (4:45)

Personnel
Nate Ruess - vocals, sampler
Jack Antonoff - guitar, drums
Andrew Dost - keyboards, piano, celeste, synthesizer, glockenspiel, background vocals
Emily Moore - keyboards, acoustic guitar, background vocals
Will Noon - drums
Nate Harold - bass

References

2013 EPs
Fun (band) albums
Fueled by Ramen EPs